Streptomyces bungoensis is a bacterium species from the genus of Streptomyces which was isolated from soil from Japan. A P450 from Streptomyces bungoensis has been used to convert pladienolide B to pladienolide D.

See also 
 List of Streptomyces species

References

Further reading

External links
Type strain of Streptomyces bungoensis at BacDive – the Bacterial Diversity Metadatabase

bungoensis
Bacteria described in 1993